My Dad's the Prime Minister is a British sitcom written by Ian Hislop and Nick Newman, and was a co-production between CBBC and BBC Entertainment. It centres on the life of the Prime Minister, his family and his spin doctor. Its main cast include Robert Bathurst, Joe Prospero, Carla Mendonça, Brian Bovell and Emma Sackville.

It was filmed at Bushey in Watford, and extras included students of the nearby Bushey Hall School and Bushey Meads School.

Series 1 was shown on BBC One as part of its CBBC strand, in April and May 2003. Season 2 was promoted to a primetime slot on BBC One, airing in November and December 2004. Series 1 focused more on Dillon (the Prime Minister's son), while the second season had greater coverage of the life of the Prime Minister.

Synopsis
Dillon Phillips is twelve years old, and also burdened with a father who is the Prime Minister and has just been voted "Naffest Man in Britain" by his favourite pop magazine. His dad's smarmy and unlikeable spin doctor, Duncan Packer, interferes with everything and the slightest bit of bad behaviour may trigger an international crisis. Dillon's mother, Clare, is a successful businesswoman and has little time for him, while his older sister, Sarah, is annoyingly bossy and dismissive of her brother and his problems: however, the pair do occasionally join forces in order to fight against their oppressive regime, and especially against Packer. At school, Dillon's only real friend is a boy known as 'Geezer', the other boys (a boy known as 'Flash', his main nemesis, in particular) frequently picking on him because of his father's position, especially when the latter shows him up, for example by arriving at the school's sports day in a helicopter. Dillon achieves some solace through imagining himself as a feisty, Jeremy Paxman-style, newsreader and interviewer, constantly interrogating his parents and sister and the odious Packer on matters that impinge on him. Most episodes open and close with these 'fantasy' newsflashes. He also occasionally gets some support from his kindly paternal grandmother, who takes surprisingly little interest in Michael's political career, preferring instead to focus on the achievements of her other son and her grandchildren.

Cast
 Robert Bathurst – Michael Phillips
 Joe Prospero – Dillon Phillips
 Carla Mendonca – Clare Phillips
 Emma Sackville – Sarah Phillips
 Jasper Britton – Duncan Packer
 Brian Bovell – Detective Andy Sharp (Series 1)
 Paterson Joseph – Detective Gary McRyan (Series 2)
 Simeon Gunn – JJ
 Joe Gunn – Geezer
 Liam Hess – Dom Clackson
 Luke Newberry – Lighthouse
 Leagh Conwell – James "Flash" Gordon
 Eugene Simon – Harry
 Marcia Warren – Granny Phillips
 Robert Vansittart – Chancellor
 Michael Cronin – Mr Speaker
 Michael Fenton Stevens – Home Secretary
 Neil McCaul – Foreign Secretary
 Jane Bertish – Education Secretary
 Martin Chamberlain – Trade and Industry Secretary
 Steve Toussaint – Transport Secretary
 Amanda Holt – Health Secretary
 Albert Welling – Opposition Leader
Kenny Ireland – Union Leader

List of Episodes

Series overview

Series 1 (2003)

Series 2 (2004)

Home Media releases
Series 1 was released on DVD and video in 2004 by DD Video, under license from the BBC.

References

External links

Short description and history of the show at BBC Comedy"
BBC Press Office for "My Dad's the Prime Minister"

2003 British television series debuts
2004 British television series endings
2000s British sitcoms
BBC television sitcoms
Television series produced at Pinewood Studios
English-language television shows
Works about British politicians